The Dawn of a Tomorrow is a 1915 American silent film starring Mary Pickford, produced by Adolph Zukor's Famous Players Film Company and directed by James Kirkwood. It is based on a 1909 stage play starring Eleanor Robson Belmont, her last stage role. This film was rereleased by Paramount in 1919 under their Success-Series banner and a copy survives in Sweden today. The story was remade in 1924 again as The Dawn of a Tomorrow with Jacqueline Logan in the lead.

Plot
The Dawn of Tomorrow is about a young girl named Glad (Mary Pickford) who becomes the inspiration for a suicidal millionaire to keep living. Glad, the selfless heroine, lives in a poor neighborhood of London. She tries to persuade her sweetheart Dandy (played by David Powell), who is an unscrupulous thief, to give up his ways, though initially not to much avail. At the same time, the millionaire Sir Oliver Holt (Forrest Robinson) has been diagnosed with incurable dementia. Because of this, Holt becomes depressed to the point where he plans his suicide.

Having disguised himself as a beggar, Holt wanders into the slums, where Glad lives. They encounter each other while he is preparing to kill himself, and Glad manages to persuade him out of suicide before it is too late. Her compassion and empathy towards Holt's sufferings touches his heart and he begins to have hope in his recovery. Meanwhile, Dandy has been falsely accused of murder, and only Holt's corrupt nephew (Robert Cain) could prove his innocence. Glad, for the sake of her love for Dandy, pleads with Holt's unnamed nephew to help him. The nephew refuses, however, and tries to assault Glad. Holt then comes to her rescue and chastises his nephew. Glad and Dandy are now finally reunited and the millionaire Holt, now seeming to be renewed in mind and spirit, vows to a life of charity and is suicidal no more.

Cast
Mary Pickford as Glad
David Powell as Dandy
Forrest Robinson as Sir Oliver Holt
Robert Cain as Holt's nephew
Margaret Seddon as Polly
Blanche Craig as Bet
Ogden Childe

Preservation status
A print is preserved in Europe at Stockholm's Enemateket-Svenska Filminstitutet.

References

External links

1915 films
American silent feature films
American films based on plays
Films based on British novels
Films based on works by Frances Hodgson Burnett
Films directed by James Kirkwood Sr.
1915 drama films
Films based on multiple works
Silent American drama films
American black-and-white films
1910s American films